Francisco Silva (born March 16, 1983 in Celaya, Guanajuato) is a Mexican professional footballer who plays for Celaya on loan from Necaxa of Ascenso MX.

External links

Liga MX players
Living people
Mexican footballers
1983 births
People from Celaya
Association footballers not categorized by position
Club Necaxa footballers
Club Celaya footballers
21st-century Mexican people